Events from the year 1476 in Ireland.

Incumbent
Lord: Edward IV

Births
John Alen, English-born canon lawyer, Archbishop of Dublin (d. 1534).

Deaths

Brian Ó hUiginn, poet.

References

 
1470s in Ireland
Ireland
Years of the 15th century in Ireland